is a railway station in Nishi-ku, Nagoya, Aichi Prefecture, Japan.

History 
It was the first railway station in Japan to allow homosexual men to kiss and hold hands.

Location 
Located nearby the station are: 

Nagoya Northern Prefecture Tax Office
Nagoya Noh Theater
Hotel Nagoya Castle
Seto Shinkin Bank, Ltd.
Sanguez Head Office
Fuji Asama Shrine
Dzoji Temple
Nagoya City Wpansa Elementary School
Nagoya City Eno Elementary School
Nagoya City Kikui Junior High School
Ami Gakuen Keimeigakukan High School Kikui Campus
Nagoya Expressway No. 6 Kiyosu Line Meido-cho Entrance
Nagoya-do-Jiangkawa Line, Prefectural Road Nagoya-Gangnam Line (same road)
Kikunoo-do ( National Route 22 )

Lines

 (Station number: T05)

Layout

Platforms

On Platform 1, door 12 is closest to the elevator, and on Platform 2, door 9 is closest to the elevator.  There is one wicket.  That station has a handicapped-accessible bathroom with a baby changing area, a coin locker, public phones, and ticket machines.

References

External links 
 

Railway stations in Japan opened in 1981
Railway stations in Aichi Prefecture